Charos Kayumova (born 1 July 1999) is an Uzbekistani taekwondo practitioner. She won the gold medal in the women's 53kg event at the 2021 Asian Taekwondo Championships held in Beirut, Lebanon.

She competed in the women's 57kg event at the 2018 Asian Games in Jakarta, Indonesia. She won her first match and she was then eliminated in her next match by Vipawan Siripornpermsak of Thailand.

In 2019, she competed in the women's bantamweight event at the World Taekwondo Championships held in Manchester, United Kingdom. In that same year, she represented Uzbekistan at the 2019 Military World Games in Wuhan, China and she won the gold medal in the 53kg event.

References

External links 
 

Living people
1999 births
Place of birth missing (living people)
Uzbekistani female taekwondo practitioners
Taekwondo practitioners at the 2018 Asian Games
Asian Games competitors for Uzbekistan
Asian Taekwondo Championships medalists
Islamic Solidarity Games medalists in taekwondo
Islamic Solidarity Games competitors for Uzbekistan
21st-century Uzbekistani women